Barry J. Lynch (born June 10, 1951, in Brooklyn, New York) is an American actor.

Awards and nominations

References

External links

1944 births
American male video game actors
Living people
American male television actors
American male voice actors
Male actors from New York City
People from Brooklyn